923 Herluga (prov. designation:  or ) is a three-body resonant background asteroid, approximately  in diameter, located in the central region of the asteroid belt. It was discovered on 30 September 1919, by astronomer Karl Reinmuth at the Heidelberg Observatory in southwest Germany. The carbonaceous C-type asteroid has a rotation period of 19.7 hours. It was named "Herluga", a common German female name unrelated to the discoverer's contemporaries, that was taken from the almanac Lahrer Hinkender Bote.

Orbit and classification 

Herluga is a non-family asteroid of the main belt's background population when applying the hierarchical clustering method to its proper orbital elements. Located in the orbital region of the Eunomia family, Herluga orbits the Sun in the central asteroid belt at a distance of 2.1–3.1 AU once every 4 years and 3 months (1,546 days; semi-major axis of 2.62 AU). Its orbit has an eccentricity of 0.19 and an inclination of 14° with respect to the ecliptic. This brings the object into a pure three-body resonance (2/2/-1) with Jupiter and Saturn (ares 2.615 AU). Other asteroids in this resonant group of 34 known objects include 70 Panopaea, 194 Prokne, 258 Tyche, 839 Valborg and 995 Sternberga. The body's observation arc begins at Heidelberg Observatory on 10 December 1919, more than two months after its official discovery observation.

Naming 

This minor planet was named "Herluga", after a female name picked from the Lahrer Hinkender Bote, published in Lahr, southern Germany. A Hinkender Bote (lit. "limping messenger") was a very popular almanac, especially in the alemannic-speaking region from the late 17th throughout the early 20th century. The calendar section contains feast days, the dates of important fairs and astronomical ephemerides. For 2 March, the calendar gives "Herluga" as the German name day analogue next to Simplizius and Luise, the protestant and catholic entries in the calendar of saints.

Reinmuth's calendar names 

As with 22 other asteroids – starting with 913 Otila, and ending with 1144 Oda – Reinmuth selected names from this calendar due to his many asteroid discoveries that he had trouble thinking of proper names. These names are not related to the discoverer's contemporaries. Lutz Schmadel, the author of the Dictionary of Minor Planet Names learned about Reinmuth's source of inspiration from private communications with Dutch astronomer Ingrid van Houten-Groeneveld, who worked as a young astronomer at Heidelberg.

Physical characteristics 

In both the Tholen- and SMASS-like taxonomy of the Small Solar System Objects Spectroscopic Survey (S3OS2), Herluga is a common, carbonaceous C-type asteroid.

Rotation period 

In November 2008, a rotational lightcurve of Herluga was obtained from photometric observations by James W. Brinsfield at the Via Capote Observatory  in California. Lightcurve analysis gave a rotation period of  hours with a brightness variation of  magnitude. In August 2016, an alternative period determination of  hours with an amplitude of  mag was published.

Diameter and albedo 

The Collaborative Asteroid Lightcurve Link adopts the results obtained by IRAS, that is, an albedo of 0.0421 and a diameter of 32.47 km based on an absolute magnitude of 11.5.

References

External links 
 Lightcurve Database Query (LCDB), at www.minorplanet.info
 Dictionary of Minor Planet Names, Google books
 Discovery Circumstances: Numbered Minor Planets (1)-(5000) – Minor Planet Center
 
 

000923
Discoveries by Karl Wilhelm Reinmuth
Named minor planets
19190930